2022 West, provisional designation , is a stony asteroid from the middle regions of the asteroid belt, approximately 12 kilometers in diameter. It was discovered by German astronomer Karl Reinmuth at Heidelberg Observatory on 7 February 1938. The asteroid was named after Danish astronomer Richard M. West.

Classification and orbit 

West orbits the Sun in the central main-belt at a distance of 2.4–3.0 AU once every 4 years and 5 months (1,625 days). Its orbit has an eccentricity of 0.12 and an inclination of 6° with respect to the ecliptic. The asteroid observation arc begins at Heidelberg one month after its official discovery observation in March 1938.

Physical characteristics 

In the SMASS classification, West is a common S-type asteroid.

Lightcurves 

In November 2016, a first rotational lightcurve of West was obtained from photometric observations by Italian astronomers. Lightcurve analysis gave a rotation period of 14.14 hours with a brightness variation of 0.50 magnitude.

Diameter 

According to the surveys carried out by the Japanese Akari satellite and the NEOWISE mission of NASA's Wide-field Infrared Survey Explorer, West measures between 11.04 and 12.916 kilometers in diameter and its surface has an albedo between 0.1682 and 0.23.

The Collaborative Asteroid Lightcurve Link assumes a standard albedo for carbonaceous asteroids of 0.057 and consequently calculates a much larger diameter of 26.64 kilometers using an absolute magnitude of 11.6.

Naming 

This minor planet was named after Danish astronomer Richard Martin West (born 1941), an observer and discoverer of minor planets at the European Southern Observatory in La Silla. West also discovered 76P/West–Kohoutek–Ikemura, a bright comet of the Jupiter family. He also was the International Astronomical Union's general secretary (1982–1985) and president of its Commission XX (1988–1991). The official  was published by the Minor Planet Center on 1 April 1978.

References

External links 
 Asteroid Lightcurve Database (LCDB), query form (info )
 Dictionary of Minor Planet Names, Google books
 Asteroids and comets rotation curves, CdR – Observatoire de Genève, Raoul Behrend
 Discovery Circumstances: Numbered Minor Planets (1)-(5000) – Minor Planet Center
 
 

  

002022
Discoveries by Karl Wilhelm Reinmuth
Named minor planets
002022
19380207